Tomasz Goliasz (born July 6, 1968) is a Polish sprint canoer who competed from the late 1980s to the mid-1990s. He won two medals at the ICF Canoe Sprint World Championships with a silver (C-2 500 m: 1989) and a bronze (1994).

Goliasz also finished fifth in the C-2 1000 m semifinal at the 1996 Summer Olympics in Atlanta, but did not advance to the final.

References

Sports-reference.com profile

1968 births
Canoeists at the 1996 Summer Olympics
Living people
Olympic canoeists of Poland
Polish male canoeists
People from Wałcz
ICF Canoe Sprint World Championships medalists in Canadian
Sportspeople from West Pomeranian Voivodeship